Zain Basketball Club formerly known as Fastlink Basketball Club was a Jordanian basketball club based in Amman, Jordan. They compete in the Jordanian Premier Basketball League and have won six consecutive Jordanian championships in the period 2003 to 2008-09 season. The team has been disbanded in 2010.

Tournament records

Jordanian Basketball League
 Jordanian Basketball Federation 2003: Champions
 Jordanian Basketball Federation 2004-05: Champions
 Jordanian Basketball Federation 2005-06: Champions
 Jordanian Basketball Federation 2006-07: Champions
 Jordanian Basketball Federation 2007-08: Champions
 Jordanian Basketball Federation 2008-09: Champions

WABA Champions Cup
 2005: 3rd place
 2006: Quarterfinalist
 2008: 3rd place
 2009: 2nd place

Asia Champions Cup
 2005: 2nd place
 2006: Champions
 2008: Quarterfinalist
 2009: 2nd place

Notable players

  Sam Daghlas
  Fadel Al-Najjar
  Enver Soobzokov
  Zaid Al-Khas
  Ahmad Al-Dwairi

Notable coaches
  Maz Trakh (2004–2006)

References

External links
page on Asia-Basket

Basketball teams established in 2002
Basketball teams in Jordan